The black-winged snowfinch or Adams's snowfinch (Montifringilla adamsi), is a species of bird in the sparrow family.

It is found in China, India, Nepal, and Pakistan. Its natural habitat is subtropical or tropical dry shrubland.

References

black-winged snowfinch
Birds of Tibet
black-winged snowfinch
Taxa named by Andrew Leith Adams
Taxonomy articles created by Polbot